Tino Černjul (born 10 October 1973 in Labin) is a former Croatian handballer, who played as a left back. 

He played eleven years in Labin mostly in the second tier of Croatian handball. His biggest success was playing for RK Zamet in the Croatian Premier Handball League (first tier) and playing EHF Cup matches with the club.

Honours
RK Rudar Labin
1.B HRL - South (1): 1992-93

RK Zamet
1.B HRL - South (1): 1995-96

RK Arena Pula
1.B HRL - South (1): 1998-99

RK Plomin Linja Rudar Labin
1.B HRL (1): 1999-2000

RK Senj
2. HRL - West (1): 2001-02

References

External links
 European Competition stats
 RK Zamet

1973 births
Living people
Croatian male handball players
People from Labin
RK Zamet players